Anita Padilla is an American television journalist best known as an anchor/reporter and works on stories that impact the lives of Chicagoans.  She is the recipient of two Emmys.

Early life
Padilla was born in Waukegan, Il a far north eastern suburb of metropolitan Chicago. She later moved to the Quad Cities (Iowa/Illinois), Orlando, Florida and New York City, NY. She currently works for Fox Chicago.

Education
Columbia College Chicago, B.A. Broadcast Journalism
University of Wisconsin, Madison, General Studies
Madison Area Technical College, General Studies

Career
Padilla's  first reporting work was as an intern for Bill Kurtis at WBBM-TV.  She went on to work in radio as an anchor and at Shadow traffic as a traffic editor. She worked at WFTV in Orlando, Florida, where she helped to run a news bureau. In 1995, she earned her first of two career Emmy Awards for breaking news coverage of an armed robbery and carjacking in Orlando by a murderer. In 2000, she earned a second Emmy for her role in a New Year's Eve Millennium celebration piece while at WMAQ Channel 5 in Chicago. She continues to report on many high-profile stories in Chicago.She had exclusive interviews with Betty Loren-Maltese on the day of her racketeering conviction and again when she was sentenced to eight years in federal prison. She reported on former Illinois Attorney General Jim Ryan's battle with cancer, the unexpected loss of his young daughter and his wife's heart attack.

In 2013 she was the Northwestern College commencement speaker. "Anita Padilla will bring a flair of excitement as our 2013 commencement speaker," commented President Schumacher. "She's a local success story having grown up in the Chicago suburbs, and we have no doubt that she will inspire our graduates as they celebrate their own personal accomplishments."

Awards
Emmy awards 1995 and 2000

References

American television news anchors
American television reporters and correspondents
Living people
People from Villa Park, Illinois
People from Chicago
University of Wisconsin–Madison alumni
Columbia College Chicago alumni
Journalists from Illinois
American women television journalists
Year of birth missing (living people)
21st-century American women